The Defence Forces Training Centre (DFTC) (ATÓÉ) is the principal training centre for the Irish Army and other branches of the Irish Defence Forces, headquartered at the Curragh Camp that serves to provide education and training to recruits and officers. The DFTC also encompasses Glen of Imaal in County Wicklow which is the primary artillery and anti-tank firing range for the army.  It primarily comprises the Military College, with various schools, alongside additional specialised schools.  It also hosts some specialised army units. DFTC is home to 2,000 military personnel.

Training Facilities 
As part of the DFTC a number of training establishments operate to train new members of the Defence Forces.

Military College 
The Military College is the principal educational facility for the training of cadets, NCO's and senior officers of the Defence Forces and the main training unit of the DTFC. Founded in 1930 the college comprises a number of constituent schools:

 Command and Staff School
 Cadet School
 Infantry School: Consisting of Officer Training Wing, Non Commissioned Officers Training Wing and Infantry Weapons Wing.
 Artillery School
 Cavalry School
 Military Administration School
 United Nations Training School Ireland
 Defence Forces Physical Education School

Other Training Schools
Other schools within the DFTC include:
 Communications and Information Services School
 Transport Vehicle Maintenance School
 Ordnance School
 Military Police School
 Engineer School
 Medical School
 Defence Forces School of Catering

Units
The DFTC also plays host to a number of independent army units not formally part of the two brigade structure:

1st Mechanised Infantry Company
Formally 'B Company' of the 3rd Infantry Battalion the 1st Mechanised Infantry Company was established in 2012 is today an independent unit of the DFTC based at the Curragh that provides training in use and operation of the Mowag Armoured Personnel Carrier.

1st Armoured Cavalry Squadron
The 1st Armoured Cavalry Squadron, based at the DFTC in the Curragh, was formed in 1998 through the merger of the 1st Armoured Car Squadron, founded in 1922 and as such the oldest cavalry unit in the Defence Forces, and the 1st Tank Squadron. The Squadron is made up of three tank troops of four tanks each and one administrative unit.

A part of the Army's Cavalry Corps the 1st Armoured Cavalry Squadron utilises the FV101 Scorpion in its role of armoured reconnaissance.

Army Ranger Wing

The Army Ranger Wing (ARW) is the elite special forces unit of the Irish Defence Forces. Highly secretive in nature the ARW has deployed overseas as part of Irish UN peacekeeping missions. Responsibilities include counter-terrorism, intelligence gathering, hostage rescue and close protection. The Army Rangers work with the Directorate of Military Intelligence (G2), the national intelligence service, and trains with the specialist firearms and tactics service of the Garda Síochána (national police), known as the Emergency Response Unit (ERU).

See also
Naval College (Ireland)
Air Corps College (Ireland)

References 

1930 establishments in Ireland
Military academies of Ireland
Military units and formations of the Irish Army